The M2 is a motorway in Belfast and County Antrim in Northern Ireland. It is in two sections, the southern section running from north Belfast to Antrim and the northern section acts as a bypass of Ballymena, with the A26 road linking the two sections. In total it is 22 miles (36.2 kilometres). The M2 has the busiest sections of any road or motorway in Northern Ireland. The M2 is one of Northern Ireland's most important motorways, forming most of the main route from Belfast city to both Belfast International Airport and less than a quarter of the way to Derry. It forms part of the unsigned European route E01, E16 and E18 roads.

Route

Southern section
The route starts at as a continuation of the M3 to the west of the River Lagan at Duncairn. It strikes north past the docks and to the east of Fortwilliam before turning west on slip roads at Junction 2. It now runs through the northern suburbs of Belfast past Whitewell and enters the hill section as it climbs at a gradient of up to 1 in 15, one of the steepest in the United Kingdom. It then passes south of Glengormley before leaving the city behind at Ballyvesy. Entering the countryside, it runs parallel to Ballymartin Water before reaching Junction 5 north of Templepatrick, then crosses Six Mile Water before arriving to the north of Burnside at Junction 6. Running around the north of Antrim, shortly after Junction 7 the road meets an incomplete junction where the motorway would have continued to Ballymena. When the road widens, it becomes the M22.

Northern section
The route begins to the south east of Ballymena at Ballycregy as a continuation of the A26 and heads north under the roundabout at junction 10. Running east of Crebilly it crosses the River Braid and turns more north west to the west of Rabbit Hill passes south of Killyflugh, passes east of Leymore and terminates on the A26 by Teeshan. The unbuilt Junction 8 was for Kells and Connor and Junction 9 for a future Ballymena southern bypass.

History
A route roughly along the line of the M2 had been planned since the 1930s, but the first concrete plans for the North Approach were announced in 1946. In 1956 proposals for several motorways, including the M2, were announced with the M2 running directly to Ballymena. Part of this alignment became the A8(M). In 1964 the plans were further extended to route the M2 via Antrim to Coleraine, away from its original direct alignment over difficult terrain, which is how the plans for construction were then progressed. The A8(M) was already under construction, so it was left as a spur.

Due to financial restraints, it was decided to prioritise the sections of the road required urgently, with the first stage being started on 2 September 1963. Construction continued until 1975, with the road being opened in the following sections:
Junctions 1 to 2 opened in 1973
Junctions 2 to 4 opened in 1966
Junctions 4 to 5 opened in 1975
Junctions 5 to M22 opened in 1971
Junctions 10 to 12 opened in 1969

In 1993 Junction 7 was opened to provide access to Antrim Area Hospital.

The section between Junctions 7 and 10 was to be the next section constructed, but with the onset of The Troubles and then direct rule, nearly all the planned motorway projects were cancelled. The A26 between M22 Junction 1 and Junction 10 of the M2 was progressively upgraded to a dual carriageway and so it is now unlikely that the M2 will ever be completed.

The section between Junctions 1A and 2 is ten lanes (five lanes and two full-width shoulders each way) and, when it was opened, was the widest motorway in the United Kingdom.

Junctions

Southern section

Notes 
 Junction 1B is the only motorway junction in the United Kingdom that consists solely of motorway exits, with no entry slip-roads
 There is no Junction 3, it was planned to be located on the Antrim Road

Northern section

Motorway service areas
Petrogas opened a Motorway service area in April 2015 off the northbound carriageway between the Glengormley and Templepatrick junctions. Branded "Applegreen" the service area contains food franchises including Burger King. A second service area is under construction off the southbound carriageway.

Plans

Southern section
 In April 2008 a plan was approved to construct a flyover enabling a direct link between the M2 and A12 Westlink, to be completed between 2013 and 2018.

See also
M22 motorway (Northern Ireland)
List of motorways in the United Kingdom
Roads in Ireland
Belfast-Derry railway line

References

External links

CBRD
Motorway Database – M2 (Northern Ireland)
 CBRD Media:
Video I including the A8(M)
Video II from the A2/M5 junction to M3
Northern Ireland Roads Site – M2
The Motorway Archive – M2 (Northern Ireland)

Motorways in Northern Ireland
Roads in Belfast
Roads in County Antrim